Shri Digamber Jain Prachin Bada Mandir is a Jain temple complex located in Hastinapur, Uttar Pradesh. It is the oldest Jain temple in Hastinapur dedicated to Shri Shantinatha, the 16th Jain Tirthankara.

History 
Hastinapur Teerth Kshetra is believed to be the birthplace of 16th, 17th and 18th tīrthaṅkaras namely, Shantinatha, Kunthunatha and Aranatha respectively. Jains also believed that it was here in Hastinapur, the first tīrthaṅkara, Rishabhanatha ended his 13-month-long penance after receiving sugarcane juice (ikshu-rasa) from King Shreyans.

Shri Digamber Jain Bada Mandir is the oldest Jain Temple in Hastinapur. The main temple was built in the year 1801 under the auspices of Raja Harsukh Rai, who was the imperial treasurer of the Emperor Shah Alam II. The 40 acre temple complex encloses a centrally located Mukhya Shikhara surrounded by a group of Jain temples dedicated to various tīrthaṅkara, mostly built in the late 20th century.

Architecture 
The principal (Mulanayak) deity in the main temple is of 16th tīrthaṅkara, Shri Shantinath in Padmasana posture. The altar also has idols of 17th and 18th tīrthaṅkaras, Shri Kunthunath and Shri Aranath on each side.  In recent year, the temple has observed increase in the number devotees.

Some of the notable monuments and temples in the complex are:

 Manastambha, built in the year 1955, it is a thirty-one feet high structure, situated outside the entrance of the main temple complex.

 Trimurti Mandir, left altar comprises a 12th-century old Shri Shantinatha idol in Kayotsarga posture, Shri Parshvanatha idol in the center and a white color Shri Mahavir Swami idol on the right altar.

 Nandishwardweep, representing an aspect of Jain cosmology was built in the 1980s. Shri Shantinatha and Shri Aranath idols are installed on both sides of the entrance.

 Samavasarana Rachna, a magnificent structure with 111 small chaityalaya, 4 manastambha, representing the Samavasarana of the 19th tīrthaṅkara, Shri Māllīnātha.

Ambika Devi Temple, an ancient idol of goddess Ambika, recovered from a nearby canal with an image of Shri Neminath carved on the head of goddess.

Other major monuments in the complex are Shri Bahubali Temple, Shri Parshwnath Temple, Jal Mandir, Kirti Stambha and  Pandukshila. Shri Digamber Jain Mandir Teeth Kshetra Committee was also set up to manage various Dharamshalas, Bhojnalaya, Jain Library, Acharya Vidyanand Museum and many other facilities for the pilgrims. The Kshetra premises also houses a Post Office, Police Sub-station, Jain Gurukul and an Udaseen ashram. Some other religious sites which comes directly under the administration of Teeth Kshetra Committee are Kailash Parvat Rachna, 24 Tirthankaras Tonks, and a cluster of four ancient Nishiyajis, situated within 1.5 km from the main temple.

Kailash Parvat Rachna
Kailash Parvat is a 131-feet high structure, built under the aegis of Shri Digambar Jain Teerth Kshetra Committee This temple is dedicated to the first tīrthaṅkara, Rishabhanatha. The Panch-kalyanak Pratishtha of Kailash Parvat was completed in April 2006. The Kailash Parvat complex includes various Jain Temples, Yatri Niwas, Bhojanshala, Auditorium, Helipad.

Nearby temples

Jambudweep Jain Teerth

Jambudweep was founded by Gyanmati Mataji in 1972 and the model of Jambudvipa was completed in 1985. Its campus has various Jain temples which includes Sumeru Parvat, Lotus Temple, Teen Murti Mandir, Meditation Temple, Badi Murti, Teen Lok Rachna and many other tourist attractions.

Shri Shwetambar Jain Temples
Shri Shantinath Shwetambar Temple was renovated in the mid 20th century and the consecration ceremony took place in Margashirsha of VS 2021. Jain Sthanak and Dada Vaadi of the Sthānakavāsī sect are also situated near to Shwetambar Temple.

Ashtapad Teerth 
Shri Ashtapad Teerth was built under the aegis of Shri Hastinapur Jain Shwetambar Teerth Trust. It is a  structure, notable for its intricate architecture and stone-carvings. Its Panch-kalyanak Pratishtha took place in December 2009 under the grace of Gachhadipati Acharya Nityanand Surishwerji. Ashtapad Teerth depicts the geography of Mount Ashtapad which according to Jain scriptures, is the site where the first Jain tirthankara, Rishabhadeva attained moksha (nirvana).

Important festivals

 Adinath Nirvana Mahotsava
 Akshaya Tritiya 
 48-day-long Bhaktamara Stotra
 Holi Fair
 40-day-long Shanti Vidhan
 Shantinatha Kalyanakas Mahotsava
 Das Lakshana
 Kartik Fair

See also 

 Parshvanath Jain temple, Varanasi
 Naya Mandir

References

Citations

Sources 
 
  
  
  
  
  
  
  
  
  
  
  
 

Jain pilgrimage sites
Jain temples in Uttar Pradesh
Tourist attractions in Meerut district
19th-century Jain temples
Jain architecture
Jain temples and tirthas